AAIF or  AaIF may refer to:

 Anglo Adriatic Investment Fund SA, English-Albanian financial company
 Aabyhøj IF, football club, Denmark